Larry Gene Nelson (born September 10, 1947) is an American professional golfer who has won numerous tournaments at both the PGA Tour and Champions Tour level.

Nelson was born in Fort Payne, Alabama and grew up in Acworth, Georgia, northwest of Atlanta. He did not play the game as a child – atypical for a successful professional golfer – in high school he focused on basketball and baseball. Nelson took up golf at the age of 21, after he returned from serving in the infantry in Vietnam (Nelson was a 20-year-old newlywed when he was drafted into the U.S. Army). Nelson was first introduced to golf by Ken Hummel, a soldier and friend in his infantry unit, and Nelson carefully studied Ben Hogan's book The Five Fundamentals of Golf while learning how to play the game. He soon discovered that he had a talent for the game, breaking 100 the first time he played and 70 within nine months. Nelson went on to graduate from Kennesaw Junior College in 1970 and turned professional the following year. He qualified for the PGA Tour at 27. Nelson's breakthrough year came in 1979, when he won twice and finished second on the money list to Tom Watson.

Nelson won 10 times on the PGA Tour, including three major championships. He earned his first major title at the 1981 PGA Championship, which he won by four strokes. In 1983, Nelson was victorious at the U.S. Open at Oakmont, coming from seven behind at the halfway point to defeat Tom Watson by a single shot. Nelson scored a U.S. Open record 65-67 over the last 36 holes at the difficult Oakmont course, which broke a 51-year Open record established by Gene Sarazen. His 10-under-par 132 record score has yet to be equaled. In 1987, he finished tied with Lanny Wadkins after the regulation 72 holes of PGA Championship, and won the title with a par at the first playoff hole.

Nelson played on the U.S. Ryder Cup team in 1979, 1981, and 1987. His record of 9–3–1 is one of the best since the event became USA v Europe in 1979; it had been a perfect 9–0–0 after the first two events.

Nelson also had great success internationally. He won four tournaments on the Japan Golf Tour. Nelson also finished runner-up at the 1982 Dunlop Phoenix Tournament and the 1987 Mitsui Sumitomo Visa Taiheiyo Masters. In addition, he finished runner-up at the PGA Tour of Australasia's 1987 New Zealand Open, losing to Northern Ireland's Ronan Rafferty in a playoff.

Since turning 50 in 1997, Nelson has had a successful Champions Tour career, winning 19 times, although he has not won a senior major. He was elected to the World Golf Hall of Fame in April 2006 and inducted in October 2006. In 2011, Nelson received the PGA Distinguished Service Award from
the PGA of America. The award "honors outstanding individuals who display leadership and humanitarian qualities, including integrity, sportsmanship and enthusiasm for the game of golf".

Nelson is also active in golf course design and created the LagRx Swing Trainer to help golfers condition and improve their muscle memory.

Professional wins (41)

PGA Tour wins (10)

PGA Tour playoff record (3–2)

Japan Golf Tour wins (4)

*Note: The 1983 Dunlop International Open was shortened to 54 holes due to rain.
1Co-sanctioned by the Asia Golf Circuit

Japan Golf Tour playoff record (2–1)

Other wins (2)
1978 Georgia Open
1988 PGA Grand Slam of Golf (United States - unofficial event)

Champions Tour wins (19)

Champions Tour playoff record (2–3)

Other senior wins (6)
1999 Chrysler Senior Match Play Challenge
2004 Office Depot Father/Son Challenge (with son Drew)
2007 Del Webb Father/Son Challenge (with son Josh)
2008 Del Webb Father/Son Challenge (with son Drew)
2015 Bass Pro Shops Legends of Golf (Legends division, with Bruce Fleisher)
2016 Bass Pro Shops Legends of Golf (Legends division, with Bruce Fleisher)

Playoff record
PGA Tour of Australasia playoff record (0–1)

Major championships

Wins (3)

1Defeated Wadkins with a par on the first extra hole.

Results timeline

CUT = missed the halfway cut (3rd round cut in 1984 Open Championship)
DQ = disqualified
WD = withdrew
"T" indicates a tie for a place.

Summary

Most consecutive cuts made – 7 (1978 PGA – 1980 Open Championship)
Longest streak of top-10s – 2 (1981 PGA – 1982 Masters)

Results in The Players Championship

CUT = missed the halfway cut
DQ = disqualified
"T" indicates a tie for a place

U.S. national team appearances
Ryder Cup: 1979 (winners), 1981 (winners), 1987
UBS Warburg Cup: 2001 (winners)
Wendy's 3-Tour Challenge (representing Senior PGA Tour): 1997, 1998 (winners)

See also

1973 PGA Tour Qualifying School graduates
List of golfers with most Champions Tour wins

References

External links

American male golfers
PGA Tour golfers
PGA Tour Champions golfers
Ryder Cup competitors for the United States
Winners of men's major golf championships
World Golf Hall of Fame inductees
Golfers from Alabama
Golfers from Georgia (U.S. state)
Kennesaw State University alumni
People from Fort Payne, Alabama
Sportspeople from Cobb County, Georgia
1947 births
Living people